Angad Singh Saini (born 1990) is an Indian politician representing Congress Party and businessman hailing from the Nawanshahr district of Punjab. In 2017, aged 26 years, he became one of the youngest members to be elected to the Punjab Legislative Assembly. He is married to Aditi Singh, MLA from Uttar Pradesh.

Nawan Shahr Vidhan Sabha seat was represented by Dilbagh Singh six times. Later Dilbagh Singh's nephew Parkash Singh won the seat in 2002. Parkash Singh lost the seat in 2007, was diagnosed with cancer the same year, and succumbed to it in 2010. Angad Singh is Parkash Singh's son. He succeeded his mother Gur Iqbal Kaur as MLA from Nawanshahr seat.

References

Punjab, India politicians
People from Nawanshahr
Living people
Punjab, India MLAs 2017–2022
Indian National Congress politicians from Punjab, India
1990 births